Becherovka, formerly Karlsbader Becherbitter, is a herbal bitters, often drunk as a digestif. It is produced in Karlovy Vary, Czech Republic by the Jan Becher company. The brand is owned by Pernod Ricard. It is made from a secret recipe based on more than twenty types of herbs and spices.

Becherovka is often described as having a gingery or cinnamon flavor. Its alcohol content is 38% ABV (76 proof), and it is usually served chilled.

History 

The inventor of Becher Bitter was Josef Vitus Becher (1769–1840) from the city then known as Carlsbad, later spelled Karlsbad. Apart from trading in spices and colonial goods in his shop, "Dům U Tří skřivanů" ("House of the Three Woodlarks"), he also produced alcoholic beverages. In 1794, he rented a still-house and began to experiment with spirits.

In 1805 Prince Maxmillian Friedrich von Plettenberg arrived in Carlsbad for medical treatment, accompanied by his personal physician, Dr. Christian Frobrig from England. Frobrig discussed with Josef Becher the strength of herbs and the recipe for a new liqueur.  Becher tested this recipe for two years, after which he began selling this new "English Bitter" liqueur, which was intended for the treatment of diseases of the stomach.

Josef married twice (his first wife died of pneumonia) and had a total of 16 children, though only five daughters and two sons outlived him. Josef's son Johann (Jan) Nepomuk Becher took over the still-house in 1838. He built a new factory and is considered as the founder of the company. His product was sold under the name of "Becher Carlsbad Bitter Liqueur" from about the 1830s on.

During the First World War, his Karlsbader Becherbitter was sold in Bohemia, Austria, Germany, Poland, Spain, Italy, Turkey and Egypt. After the end of Prohibition in the United States, the Becherbitter went on sale in that country and four years later also in England. After the Second World War, Karlsbader Becherbitter became known as Becherovka following the dispossession and forceful expulsion of the German population of Karlovy Vary by the Czech state (see Beneš decrees). Becherovka became one of Czechoslovakia's most popular export items.

From 1998 to 2003, a Slovak version also was sold. This was manufactured by Zdeněk Hoffmann domestically (Domažlice) and sold in Slovak shops. Hoffmann claimed that Alfred Becher had given his grandfather the recipe in 1939 with the right to manufacture the product, since he had been worried that the secret of his recipe might not survive the war. However, Hoffmann was unable to prove this in court, and in 2008 he was sentenced by the district court to a year and a half in jail.

The Czech producer says that only two people know the secret of the entire production process and are allowed to enter the Drogikamr room – where, once a week, they mix the herbs and spices used in the drink. Some of the herbs are imported from abroad, and some grow around Karlovy Vary.

Lemond 

Becherovka Lemond is the commercial name of a liqueur which has been produced by Becherovka since 2008. It is based on the traditional Becherovka, but has a lower alcohol content (20% ABV). Lemond is usually consumed straight and takes its name from the drink's citrus taste. Its recipe is also kept secret, just like the recipe of the traditional Becherovka.

Cocktails 

Some serve it with tonic water, making a drink called a beton (becherovka and tonic), which means "concrete" in Czech and many other languages. This cocktail was originally created for Expo '67 in Montreal as a refreshment to be served in the Czech Pavilion. It also proved to be very popular in the Czech Republic during the 90s.

See also

References

External links 

 Becherovka official site
 Becherovka
 Jan Becher Museum in Karlovy Vary
 Becherovka liqueurs info
 Sale of Johann Becher OHG
 Radio Prague 2005 on Hedda Baier-Becher

 
1807 introductions
Anise liqueurs and spirits
Bitters
Czech brands
Czech distilled drinks
Herbal liqueurs
Pernod Ricard brands